Mark J Adshead (born 4 April 1963) is a male retired British judoka.

Judo career
In 1986, he won the bronze medal in the 65kg weight category at the judo demonstration sport event as part of the 1986 Commonwealth Games. In 1987, he became a champion of Great Britain, winning the British Judo Championships featherweight category.

He competed in the 1988 Summer Olympics. He represented England and won a bronze medal in the 65 kg half-lightweight division, at the 1990 Commonwealth Games in Auckland, New Zealand.

References

1963 births
Living people
Judoka at the 1988 Summer Olympics
British male judoka
Olympic judoka of Great Britain
People from Altrincham
Commonwealth Games medallists in judo
Commonwealth Games bronze medallists for England
Judoka at the 1990 Commonwealth Games
Medallists at the 1990 Commonwealth Games